The following is a list of Connecticut weather records observed at various stations across the state during the last 100 years. Connecticut is a state in the Northeast region of the United States.

Temperature

Precipitation

Rain

Snow

Tornadoes 

Between 1953 and 2004, there was an average of one tornado per year within the Connecticut.

See also

General 

List of weather records

Large-scale events that affected Connecticut 

 Hurricane Sandy
 2011 Halloween nor'easter
 1938 New England hurricane
 Great Blizzard of 1888

Further reading

References 

Lists of weather records
American records
Weather